Derya Çimen is a Turkish model who was runner-up at the Miss Model Of The World 2009 beauty pageant held in China. She also won the mini award for Best National Costume with a costume designed by Erkan Kara.

Çimen was selected to represent her nation after winning the Miss Model of Turkey pageant in Çeşme. She stands at 183 cm tall and weighs 62 kg.

References

Year of birth missing (living people)
Living people
Turkish beauty pageant winners
Turkish female models